is a Japanese manga series by Junko Kawakami. Chūgakusei Nikki is serialized in the monthly  manga magazine Feel Young since June 2013. A live-action drama began airing in October for the Fall 2018 season.

Plot
Akira Kuroiwa, a third year middle school student, falls in love with his new homeroom teacher, Hijiri Suenaga. Akira struggles with these feelings knowing their age gap and the fact that Hijiri already has a longtime boyfriend who she is engaged to. Akira is disheartened at first, but things change by the time he is 18, when Hijiri has broken up with her fiancé.

Characters

Main characters

Portrayed by Kasumi Arimura (drama)
Hijiri is a 25-year-old teacher at a middle school. Her students often refer to her by her first name instead of addressing her as a teacher.

Portrayed by Kenshi Okada (drama)
Akira is the narrator of the story. As a 14-year-old student in Hijiri's 9th grade class, he slowly discovers that he is in love with her. By volume 3, he is a second year student in high school and his feelings towards her have not changed.

Portrayed by Keita Machida (drama)
Shotaro is Hijiri's longtime boyfriend and fiance, whom she has dated since college. The two currently maintain a long distance relationship due to Shotaro's job. While Shotaro is in Osaka, his superior, Ritsu, begins flirting with him, complicating their relationship. Eventually, he and Hijiri break up in volume 4.

Supporting characters

Portrayed by Rina Ono (drama)
Runa is Akira's strong-willed classmate and friend. She is in love with Akira.

Portrayed by Jiei Wakabayashi (drama)
Junichiro is Akira's classmate and friend. He is the class clown and also a troublemaker.

Portrayed by Yo Yoshida (drama)
Ritsu is Shotaro's superior at work. She begins flirting with him and eventually falls in love.

Portrayed by Yui Natsukawa (drama)
Aiko is Akira's mother. As a single mother, she tries to juggle his emotional well-being along with her job. She gets along very well with Hijiri until she finds out Akira is in love with her.

Media

Manga

Chugakusei Nikki is serialized in the monthly magazine Feel Young since June 2013. The chapters were later released in bound volumes were by Shodensha.

Television drama

A live-action television series adaptation was announced in July 2018 and slated for release in October 2018. The series is directed by Ayuko Tsukahara, Kentarō Takemura, and Toshio Tsuboi, with Arisa Kaneko writing the script. The series stars Kasumi Arimura as Hijiri, Kenshi Okada as Akira (in his debut acting role), and Keita Machida as Shōtarō. Additional cast members include Yui Natsukawa as Aiko (Akira's mother), Yo Yoshida as Ritsu, and Mari Natsuki as Shiotani. Two original characters were also created for the television series and included Makita Sports as Shigeru and Tomochika as Chizuru. The television series aired weekly on TBS at 10 PM.

The first episode of the live-action series gained at 6.0% viewership, with many viewers expressing discomfort at the subject matter of the series. Despite that Akira is 15 years old in the series, the production opted to cast 19-year-old Okada as they could not hire an actor closer to the character's age.

Episodes

Reception

Chugakusei Nikki won the 7th Anan Manga Awards in 2016.

References

External links
 
 Official television series website

Japanese television dramas based on manga
Josei manga
Shodensha manga